Cambalida is a genus of corinnid sac spiders first described by Eugène Simon in 1910.

Species
 it contains fourteen species in India and Africa:
Cambalida compressa Haddad, 2012 – West Africa
Cambalida coriacea Simon, 1910 – West, Central Africa
Cambalida deminuta (Simon, 1910) – West, Central Africa
Cambalida deorsa Murthappa, Prajapati, Sankaran & Sebastian, 2016 – India
Cambalida dhupgadensis Bodkhe, Uniyal & Kamble, 2016 – India
Cambalida dippenaarae Haddad, 2012 – Southern Africa
Cambalida fagei (Caporiacco, 1939) – Ethiopia
Cambalida flavipes (Gravely, 1931) – India
Cambalida fulvipes (Simon, 1896) – Africa
Cambalida griswoldi Haddad, 2012 – Madagascar
Cambalida lineata Haddad, 2012 – Madagascar
Cambalida loricifera (Simon, 1886) – Senegal
Cambalida tuma Murthappa, Prajapati, Sankaran & Sebastian, 2016 – India
Cambalida unica Haddad, 2012 – Cameroon

References

Araneomorphae genera
Corinnidae
Spiders of Africa
Spiders of Asia
Taxa named by Eugène Simon